Heteroglenea mediodiscoprolongata is a species of beetle in the family Cerambycidae. It was described by Stephan von Breuning in 1964, originally under the genus Glenea. It is known from Laos, China, and Thailand.

References

Saperdini
Beetles described in 1964